Qarah may refer to:
Qərəh, a village in the Siazan Rayon of Azerbaijan
Qarah, Iran, a village in Chaharmahal and Bakhtiari Province, Iran
Qarah, Syria, a town in the Qalamoun District of the Rif Dimashq Governorate of Syria
Tell Qarah, a village in Aleppo Governorate, Syria
Qarah, Hama, a village in Hama Governorate, Syria
Al Qarah, Yemen, a village in Yemen